Eremoblastus is a genus of flowering plants belonging to the family Brassicaceae.

Its native range is Central Asia.

Species:
 Eremoblastus caspicus Botch.

References

Brassicaceae
Brassicaceae genera